Señorita República Dominicana 1968 was held on January 24, 1968. There were 24 candidates who competed for the national crown. The winner represented the Dominican Republic at the Miss Universe 1968. The Virreina al Miss Mundo entered Miss World 1968. Only 25 provinces and one municipality entered. The top 10 wore their evening gowns and answered questions so they could go to the top from which five were selected.

Results 

 Señorita República Dominicana 1968: Ana María Ortíz Mendoza (Puerto Plata)
 Virreina al Miss Mundo: Ingrid Marie García de Cano (Duarte)
 1st Runner Up: Ursula German (Santiago)
 2nd Runner Up: Elizabeth Suarez (Distrito Nacional)
 3rd Runner Up: Yolanda Ureña (Samaná)

 Top 10
 Nicol Reynoso (Monte Cristi)
 Martha González (San Pedro)
 Gina Varbaros (Valverde)
 Luiza Taveras (Santiago Rodríguez)
 Milka Juanes (Séibo)

Special awards 

 Miss Rostro Bello – Ursula German (Santiago)
 Miss Photogenic (voted by press reporters) – Nidez Arias (San Juan de la Maguana)
 Miss Congeniality (voted by Miss Dominican Republic Universe contestants) – Eva Padron (San Cristóbal)

Delegates 

 Azua – Margarita Ceasrina Duarte Toledo
 Ciudad Santo Domingo – María Alejandrina Ramírez Cruz
 Dajabón – Isabel Estefania de la Cruz Agujeros
 Delta Neiba – Katherine Yanet Ynoa Alvarado
 Distrito Nacional – Elizabeth Rolanda Suarez Soriano
 Duarte – Ingrid Marie García de Cano
 Espaillat – Esther Deis Díaz Pedros
 La Altagracia – Tatiana Katalina Bienvenido Loano
 La Estrelleta – María Teresa Alvarado Alvares
 La Vega – Mary Alba Rodríguez Brito
 Monte Cristi – Nicol Vivian Reynoso Santuario
 Pedernales – Estefania Alejandra Cruz Martínez
 Peravia – Laura Agynes Hidalgo Pineda
 Puerto Plata – Ana María Ortíz Mendoza
 Salcedo – Ada Sandra Abreu Marron
 Samaná – Yolanda Margarita Ureña Sanz
 Sánchez Ramírez – Jessica Marie Meran Ferro
 San Cristóbal – Eva Tatiana Padron Peralta
 San Juan de la Maguana – Nidez Ludwicka Arias Fermin
 San Pedro – Martha Carina González Caba
 Santiago – Ursula Bereniz German Bienvenidos
 Santiago Rodríguez – Luiza María Taveras Delirio
 Séibo – Milka Reyna Juanes Tavaras
 Valverde – Ana Gina Varbaros Oviedo

Miss Dominican Republic
1968 beauty pageants
1968 in the Dominican Republic